Tinicephalus is a genus of mostly European capsid bugs in the tribe Phylini, erected by Franz Xaver Fieber in 1858.    The species Tinicephalus hortulanus is recorded from northern Europe including the British Isles.

Species 
According to BioLib the following are included:
subgenus Lavendulaephylus Wagner, 1972
 Tinicephalus rubiginosus Fieber, 1861
subgenus Tinicephalus Fieber, 1858
 Tinicephalus croceus Wagner, 1969
 Tinicephalus dentifer Linnavuori, 1965
 Tinicephalus discrepans Fieber, 1858
 Tinicephalus hortulanus (Meyer-Dür, 1843)
 Tinicephalus indistinctus Wagner, 1962
 Tinicephalus macciae Lindberg, 1934
 Tinicephalus nigropilosus Wagner, 1977
 Tinicephalus picticornis Wagner, 1966
 Tinicephalus rubropictus Wagner, 1972
 Tinicephalus varensis Wagner, 1964
 Tinicephalus vicarius Linnavuori, 1984
Unplaced taxa
 Tinicephalus atricornis (Wagner, 1965)
 Tinicephalus streitoi Matocq, 2007

References

External links
 

Miridae genera
Hemiptera of Europe
Phylini